Jonathan Josué Rubio Toro (born 21 October 1996) is a Honduran professional footballer who plays as a winger or an attacking midfielder for Liga Portugal 2 club Académico Viseu and the Honduras national team.

Club career
Born in San Pedro Sula, Toro joined FC Sion's youth setup in 2014, from Barcelona-based Fundación Marcet. On 22 January 2015 he joined Gil Vicente, being promoted to the first team in June.

Toro made his professional debut on 8 August 2015, coming on as a late substitute for Simeon Nwankwo in a 1–1 home draw against C.D. Mafra. On 28 January 2017, after appearing sparingly, he was loaned to Segunda División B side Arandina CF until June. Upon returning to Gil Vicente, Toro became a regular starter and scored his first professional goal on 28 October 2017, netting the opener in a 4–0 home routing of Benfica B. He finished the campaign with three goals in 37 appearances, but his side eventually suffered relegation.

On 9 July 2018, Toro signed for La Liga side SD Huesca, but was loaned to Varzim on 10 August. The following 30 January he was recalled by his parent club, and moved to Académica de Coimbra the following day, also in a temporary loan deal. On 19 July, he moved to first division side C.D. Tondela on a season long loan. He made his Primeira Liga debut in the opening fixture on 12 August, a 0–0 draw against Vitória He scored his first goal the following 15 September in a 4–2 win against Rio Ave and in August 2020, he was named Tondela's 2019–20 Player of the Season.

After terminating his contract with Huesca, Toro signed for LigaPro club G.D. Chaves on 7 October 2020. He made his debut on 1 December in a 2–1 away defeat to Casa Pia He scored his first goal the following 6 February, the second in a 3–1 away win against his former club Varzim.

On 7 July 2021, Toro joined first division club C.D. Santa Clara, but was immediately loaned once again to Académica de Coimbra in the second tier.

On 6 July 2022, Toro signed with another second division side, this time joining Académico de Viseu.

International career
Toro was included in the provisional squad for Honduras in the 2019 CONCACAF Gold Cup, but was dropped from the final squad.

Toro made his international debut on 5 September 2019, in a friendly against Puerto Rico, scoring a goal and providing two assists in a 4–0 win.

International goals
Scores and results list Honduras's goal tally first.

References

External links 
 
 
 

1996 births
Living people
People from San Pedro Sula
Honduran footballers
Honduras international footballers
Association football forwards
Gil Vicente F.C. players
Arandina CF players
SD Huesca footballers
Varzim S.C. players
Associação Académica de Coimbra – O.A.F. players
C.D. Tondela players
G.D. Chaves players
Académico de Viseu F.C. players
Primeira Liga players
Segunda División B players
Liga Portugal 2 players
Honduran expatriate footballers
Honduran expatriate sportspeople in Spain
Honduran expatriate sportspeople in Portugal
Expatriate footballers in Portugal
Expatriate footballers in Spain